Parliamentary elections were held in Iceland on 5 August 1916, the first elections held after women's suffrage was introduced. Following reforms to the Althing the previous year, the six seats in the Upper House appointed by the monarch were abolished, and replaced with six elected seats. The seats were elected by proportional representation at the national level, using the D'Hondt method. The remaining eight seats were elected along with the Lower House in October.

Results

References

1916 08
Iceland
Parliament 1
Iceland